Luis Bernardo de Tavora (1723-1759) was the fourth Marquis of Távora. He was the son of Francisco de Assis de Tavora, third count of Alvor, and Leonor Tomásia de Távora, 3rd Marquise of Távora. Luis Bernardo married Teresa de Tavora e Lorena in 1742. Neither he nor Teresa had any descent. He was one of the thirteen people executed in Lisbon, January 13, 1759, convicted of attempting to kill the King of Portugal, Joseph I.

See also
Távora affair

1723 births
1759 deaths
Margraves of Tavora

Portuguese nobility